Gugu may refer to:

Geography
Gugu, tributary of the Șes in Caraș-Severin County, Romania
Güğü, Dursunbey, a village in Turkey
Gugu Thaypan language, Paman language spoken on the southwestern part of the Cape York Peninsula, Queensland, Australia
Gugu Uwanh dialect, Paman language spoken on the Cape York Peninsula of Queensland, Australia
Mount Gugu, mountain located in central Ethiopia

People
Gugu, alternative spelling of Gyges of Lydia (reigned c.687–c.652 BCE)
Costinel Gugu (born 1992), Romanian footballer
Gugu Gill (also spelt Guggu Gill), Punjabi film actor
Gugu Mbatha-Raw (born 1983), English actress
Gugu Liberato (1959–2019), Brazilian TV presenter
Gugu (Oz), a fictional leopard character in The Magic of Oz
Carlos Gustavo Moreira, (born 1973), Brazilian mathematician known as Gugu
Gugu (footballer) (born 1985), Luis Miguel Aparecido Alves, Brazilian footballer

es:Gugu
pt:Gugu